Freihofer's Run for Women is an annual five-kilometer road running competition for women that is usually held in late May or early June in Albany, New York, United States. First held in 1979, the race has grown into a sizable event that holds IAAF Silver Label Road Race status and had 3,927 participants at the 2010 edition. The 2011 edition garnered 5,000 entires, four-fifths of whom are distance runners.

A 10-kilometer race was held concurrently with the 5K race from its inaugural edition, with the longer race serving as the elite race until 1989. The 5K race has been the elite race since 1989 while the 10K was removed from the annual race's events in 1991. The race has been the venue for the national road championships on many occasions: acting as the 10K championships from 1979 to 1988, and then serving as the 5K nationals in 1989, 1990 and 1993 to 2004. Five women have participated in the FRW every year since it began, including Denise Herman, a local runner who won the 5k in 1984 and again in 1987.

Lynn Jennings is the race's most successful runner, having won the 10K race twice and the 5K race a further six times over the period between 1987 and 1998. Marla Runyan, who is legally blind due to Stargardt disease, won three consecutive national titles at the Freihofer's Run for Women from 2002–2004.

In 2005, the race was won in record time by Asmae Leghzaoui, though several world class athletes boycotted the event due to Leghzaoui's history of using illegal substances. Her course record was broken by Emily Chebet who ran a time of 15:12 to win the 2010 race. Betty Jo Geiger remains the record holder for the 10K race with her 1986 winning time of 32:13.

The 5K course, certified by USA Track & Field, begins and ends near the New York State Museum on Albany's Madison Avenue. It heads westwards and enters Washington Park after the first kilometer. The course twists along the footpaths through the park before heading north along Lake Avenue around the half-way point. After heading east along Western and Washington Avenue, the route turns south, looping back onto Madison Avenue, and then heads downhill directly to the finish.

Past winners

5K race
Key:

10K race

Statistics
Note: Statistics for elite races only

Winners by country

Multiple winners

References

List of winners
Freihofer's Run for Women 5 km. Association of Road Racing Statisticians (2010-06-05). Retrieved on 2010-06-06.

External links
 Official website

5K runs
Sports in Albany, New York
Road running competitions in the United States
Recurring sporting events established in 1979
Women's athletics competitions
1979 establishments in New York (state)